Gateway House in Manchester, England, is a modernist office block above a row of shops designed by Richard Seifert & Partners and completed in 1969. It replaced a row of 19th-century railway warehouses on the approach to Manchester Piccadilly station. The building, which differed from much of Seifert's contemporary work in that it departed from the bare concrete brutalist style which had become his trademark, was nicknamed the "lazy S" and was reputedly designed as a doodle.

Reception
It is considered to be one of Siefert's most loveable buildings, commanding respect from Clare Hartwell, who described it as

Future
The building was bought by Realty Estates in 2008. Hodder + Partners won a competition to redevelop Gateway House in 2009. The plans are for the landmark structure to be converted into a hotel at a cost of £20 million. An office block with ground floor retail space on Ducie Street and a gym behind the Seifert building would be the second phase of the development. In December 2011, the £35 million redevelopment scheme by Hodder + Partners for Realty Estates, was given planning approval by Manchester City Council.

Despite planning approval, redevelopment has not started. In June 2014, the building was sold to international property group, LaSalle for £26m. A new let was agreed with Waitrose and work could begin on renovating the building with a new hotel operator.

A major redevelopment of the neighbouring Piccadilly Station and the surrounding area has been proposed to complement the planned construction of the High Speed 2 (HS2) railway line to Manchester. The project would involve the construction of a large new canopy over the HS2 platforms and the creation of a new entrance to the station. As part of the HS2 redevelopment plans it is likely that Gateway House will be demolished.

Refurbishment commenced in October 2015 and was completed in early 2017.

References
Notes

Bibliography

Buildings and structures in Manchester
Office buildings completed in 1969
Modernist architecture in England